Mentocrex is a genus of birds in the flufftail family, Sarothruridae. The genus includes two species, both of which are endemic to forests in Madagascar.

Species
The genus contains two species.

 Madagascar wood rail (Mentocrex kioloides)
 Tsingy wood rail (Mentocrex beankaensis)

These two species were formerly placed in the genus Canirallus together with the grey-throated rail (Canirallus oculeus). A molecular genetic study published in 2019 found that the grey-throated rail is not closely related to the Madagascan and tsingy wood rails. The grey-throated rail is related to the Rallidae while the wood rails are closely related to the Sarothrura.

References

 
Bird genera